Davie Ross (born 2 May 1951) is a retired Scottish semi-professional footballer who played as a left winger in the Scottish League for Cowdenbeath, St Johnstone and Forfar Athletic.

Career statistics

Honours 
Cowdenbeath

Scottish League Second Division: 1969–70

Individual

Cowdenbeath Hall of Fame

References 

Scottish footballers
Cowdenbeath F.C. players
Scottish Football League players
1951 births
Living people
Footballers from Fife
Association football wingers
St Johnstone F.C. players
Forfar Athletic F.C. players
People from Kennoway